Lifescape was a glossy monthly magazine aimed mostly at women who want to live a more cruelty-free, healthy, green and interesting life. It was a colourful, upbeat and genuine alternative to other women's magazines available and was published by Madafu Publishing Ltd in London.

History and profile
Lifescape was set up by Rajasana Otiende in 2005. The first issue appeared on 13 September 2005. The magazine was sold in WH Smiths, Borders, Waitrose and independent newsagents. It was part of the 'Just Ask!' campaign and so readers could request their local newsagent to stock the magazine.

The magazine covered fair trade fashion, cruelty-free and vegan beauty products, social issues, health, nutrition, home, travel and more. It was also the only vegetarian magazine on sale at British newsstands.

Each year Lifescape commended companies that were making a difference by producing cruelty-free cosmetics in its Beauty Awards. It also run Food Awards for vegetarian or vegan, fair trade and organic foods which were providing excellent options for people who eat with a conscience.

References

External links
 Lifescape website

2005 establishments in the United Kingdom
Defunct women's magazines published in the United Kingdom
Lifestyle magazines published in the United Kingdom
Magazines established in 2005
Magazines published in London
Monthly magazines published in the United Kingdom
Vegetarian publications and websites
Magazines with year of disestablishment missing